Hannu Turunen (born 24 June 1956) is a Finnish former footballer. Turunen played for Koparit and KuPS during his club career, also making 66 appearances for the Finland national football team, scoring 3 goals.

External links and references
 
 Finland – International Player Records

1956 births
Living people
People from Savonlinna
Finnish footballers
Finland international footballers
Footballers at the 1980 Summer Olympics
Olympic footballers of Finland
Association football defenders
Association football midfielders
Sportspeople from South Savo